This is a list of awards and nominations received by South Korean girl group Girl's Day since their debut in 2010.


Awards and nominations

Other accolades

Lists

References 

Girl's Day
Awards